Jess Walter (born July 20, 1965) is an American author of seven novels, two collections of short stories, and a non-fiction book. He is the recipient of the Edgar Allan Poe Award, and was a finalist for the National Book Award in 2006.

Career
Walter has published seven novels, Over Tumbled Graves, Land of the Blind, Citizen Vince, The Zero, The Financial Lives of the Poets, Beautiful Ruins, and The Cold Millions. In 2013, he published his first collection of short stories, We Live in Water, which President Barack Obama named one of his favorite books in 2019. In 2022, he published his second collection of short stories, The Angel of Rome. His essays and short stories have also appeared in Best American Short Stories, Best American Nonrequired Reading, McSweeny's, Esquire, Harper's, Byliner, Playboy, ESPN the Magazine, Details, and other publications. His books have been published in thirty-two countries and translated into thirty-two languages.

Walter's novel Beautiful Ruins was a number one New York Times best seller. It was also named Esquire's Book of the Year, NPR Fresh Air's Best Novel of 2012, a New York Times Notable Book, and a Washington Post Notable Book. Maureen Corrigan of NPR's Fresh Air called this novel a "literary miracle"  and Steve Almond of The Boston Globe described it as "a novel with pathos, piercing wit, and, most important, the generous soul of a literary classic".

Walter's 2009 novel The Financial Lives of the Poets was named one of the best books of the year by Time, The Washington Post, Los Angeles Times, The Believer, NPR's Fresh Air, and several others. Walter also writes screenplays, and has written the screenplay for a possible film adaptation of The Financial Lives of the Poets.

His 2006 novel The Zero was a finalist for the National Book Award. In a 2006 Washington Post book review, John McNally writes that with The Zero Walter has "written a new thriller not only with a conscience but also full of dead-on insights into our culture ... and the often surreal post-9/11 world."

Citizen Vince, Walter's 2005 novel, earned him the Edgar Allan Poe Award for best novel in 2006.

Walter is also a career journalist, whose work has appeared in The New York Times, The Washington Post and The Boston Globe.  As a reporter he covered the Randy Weaver/Ruby Ridge case for the Spokane Spokesman-Review newspaper and authored a book about the case, Every Knee Shall Bow (revised edition titled Ruby Ridge). He also was the co-author with Christopher Darden of the 1996 bestseller In Contempt.

Family
Walter lives with his wife, Anne, and their children, Brooklyn, Ava and Alec, in his childhood hometown of Spokane, Washington. He is an alumnus of East Valley High School (Spokane, Washington) and Eastern Washington University.

Bibliography

Novels
Over Tumbled Graves (2001)
The Land of the Blind (2003)
Citizen Vince (2005)
The Zero (2006)
The Financial Lives of the Poets (2009)
Beautiful Ruins (2012)
The Cold Millions (2020)

Short story collections
We Live in Water: Stories (2013) 
The Angel of Rome: And Other Stories (2022)

Non-fiction
Every Knee Shall Bow (1995) (re-released as Ruby Ridge: The Truth and Tragedy of the Randy Weaver Family in 2002)
In Contempt (co-authored with Christopher Darden) (1996)

Awards
 2006 : Edgar Allan Poe Award for best novel Citizen Vince
 2006 : National Book Award Finalist for best novel The Zero
 2006 : Finalist for Washington State Book Award in Fiction for The Zero
 2007 : Finalist for Washington State Book Award in Fiction for Citizen Vince
 2007 : Pacific Northwest Booksellers Award for The Zero
 2007 : LA Times Book Prize for The Zero
 2011 : Finalist for Washington State Book Award in Fiction for The Financial Lives of the Poets
 2012 : New York Times 100 Notable Books of 2012 list for Beautiful Ruins
2021: Washington State Book Award for Fiction for The Cold Millions.

References

External links
 Official Jess Walter website
 Fantastic Fiction - Jess Walter
 The Bat Segundo Show (radio interviews): 2007 (40 minutes) and 2012 (50 minutes)

1965 births
Living people
21st-century American novelists
American male novelists
Edgar Award winners
Writers from Spokane, Washington
Place of birth missing (living people)
Eastern Washington University alumni
21st-century American male writers
Novelists from Washington (state)